Back is a district and a village on the east coast of the Isle of Lewis in the Outer Hebrides, Scotland, situated on a coastal area known as Loch a'Tuath, or Broad Bay. Back is within the parish of Stornoway, and is situated on the B895. The village/district utilises the motto "Tre Dhilseachd Buaidh" (Through Loyalty Success) as seen on the crest of Back FC.

District villages 
The district of Back comprises a number of villages, all of which are on the coast of Broadbay. These are: Gearraidh Ghuirm, Upper Coll, Coll, Inner Coll, Vatisker, Back and Gress.

Transport 
The district of Back is located approximately five miles from Stornoway by road, and is accessed by the B895 from its junction with the A857 north of Stornoway.

The District of Back is served by the W5 bus route (Mon-Saturday only). Timetables available at:

https://web.archive.org/web/20140413125034/http://www.cne-siar.gov.uk/travel/busservice/current/indexlh.asp

Back school - Sgoil a'Bhac 
Sgoil a’ Bhac, is a primary and former secondary education school. However, secondary education was discontinued in the early 2010's with future secondary pupils being educated within the Nicolson Institute in Stornoway. 

The school currently caters for pupils aged 5 to 11 years, with an enrollment of approx. 190-200 pupils. In addition, the school has a nursery department for pre-school children. The school is structured around two divisions - a 'mainstream' English language division, and a Gaelic medium division in which half the pupils in the school are enrolled, receiving their primary education almost exclusively in the (Scottish) Gaelic language.

Sgoil a’ Bhac is a true community school, the school is used for community events every other week, and the school enjoys a strong relationship with the local Free Church of Scotland. The school has a rich history of sport, particularly that of Football and Badminton, this can be seen in the many local tournaments the school sides have won.

Local Community Facilities and Groups 
The Hut - Community Hall: a small community hall with a kitchen that provides hall and room hire to local groups and for local meetings and children's parties etc.

Gress Angling Association - are the lease holders and managers of the angling rights to the Gress River. The Angling Association manage and maintain the river and fishing records, and offer children's fishing events and activities. The river is a significant salmon, sea trout and brown trout river, that is tidal for approx. a mile of its course. The river can be fished from June–October (not on Sundays), and a fee is payable either as an annual membership, or as a day ticket. The river operates a catch and release. Information and tickets from: Sportsworld, 1 - 3 Francis Street, Stornoway.

Loch a Tuath News - is a community run monthly magazine that provides local district news, local features and history, and which covers the Tong district as well as Back. The magazine has a Facebook page, and copies can be obtained in local shops and supermarkets as well as by subscription.

Còisir Sgìre a' Bhac - a local traditional Gaelic choir that has enjoyed significant success at the annual Royal National Mod over many years.

The Coll Centre - sports groups, activities and facilities - see Sport section below.

Tourism 
Although not as well known or visited as some of the main tourism locations in the Outer Hebrides, the District of Back, and its neighbouring districts in Tong and Tolsta have some of the finest beaches in the islands. The District of Back has extensive sandy beaches at Coll, Vatisker and Gress. The District's beaches are being increasingly recognized as excellent surf and water sport locations, year round.

The District's rivers are good for salmon, sea trout and brown trout - there are two small fishable rivers in Coll (The Angus River and Coll River), and the main river at Gress. Permits are required to fish these rivers, but surrounding the district in the moorland areas are a number of lochs (mostly good for brown trout) that can be fished without angling association permits. See Gress Angling Association above for more details.

Due to over-fishing and trawling in the recent past,  the District's coast and beaches are no longer as good for sea fishing, having a very depleted white fish population.

Wildlife - the area is home to significant populations of coastal and estuary birdlife, raptors and moorland birds. The unique corncrake can also be heard in the district during summer months, as can the cuckoo - making quite a potent nighttime mixture of bird calls - which are added to by the sound of snipe drumming over the estuary and moorlands. Broad Bay has a significant population of seals and other sea mammals.

Tourist Accommodation:

There are a number of quality B&Bs and self-catering facilities in the district, please see Visit Outer Hebrides website for details.

Religion 
The community puts a massive emphasis on religion. The local church is a Free Church of Scotland. Each service is delivered either in English, or Scottish Gaelic. Ministers serving the congregation have included Rev Donald MacMaster (the first incumbent) and Rev Iain D. Campbell. The Rev Calum Iain MacLeod is the current minister at Back Free Church. Two CDs of a cappella Gaelic psalm singing were recorded at the church.

Sport 

Football is the most popular sport in Back, with some community members attending games. Back F.C. was formed in 1933 and play beside the beach at Upper Coll.

The facilities, known as the Coll Centre, boast some of the best sporting facilities in the North of Scotland:
There is a big hall, the size of 5 badminton courts. 
An astro turf pitch, which is currently being turned from an outdoor to an indoor pitch with the addition of a roof. 
A full sized natural grass football pitch, which the football club play their games on. 
In 2011, a golf driving range was opened adjacent to the grass football pitch. 
There is also a beach across the road, often used for football training.
Back F.C. are named after the district Back and have a large pull from the internal villages. Others have played for the blues, including people from the island, neighbouring islands and incomers. It is the youth that make up the side, this is down to a development club where children from as young as eight attend two training sessions a week.

The club have won many trophies since they began, including the highly sought after Eilean Fhraoich Cup on 17 occasions. Only those who live in the district or have close family are eligible to play in the cup, which gives the players a sense of pride.

Back won the 'big one' in 2004 when they won the Highland Amateur Cup. Clubs from all over the Highlands and Islands compete in this knock-out cup and it is what all the clubs in the region dream of winning.

Since winning the Highland Amateur Cup, the club has struggled at senior level to reach these heights again, but on the junior front they have dominated, with the under 18 side winning the treble in an undefeated season.

Andy Gray, who went on to play for the national side, Scotland, as well as Rangers F.C., Wolves F.C., Aston Villa F.C. and Everton F.C., where he won the UEFA Cup Winners' Cup, played for the club as a youth.

References

External links

 Back Free Church
 Sgoil a'Bhac
 Back FC

Villages in the Isle of Lewis